is the railway station in Ōmura, Nagasaki Prefecture, Japan. It is operated by JR Kyushu and is on the Ōmura Line.

Lines
Only local services on the line stop at the station.

Station layout 
The station consists of two side platforms serving two tracks. The station building is a small timber structure and is unstaffed, housing only a waiting room. The two platforms are connected by a level crossing but there is a short flight of steps up from the access road and station forecourt to the station building.

Adjacent stations

History
Japanese Government Railways (JGR) opened the station on 20 March 1945 as an additional station on the existing track of the Ōmura Line. With the privatization of Japanese National Railways (JNR), the successor of JGR, on 1 April 1987, control of the station passed to JR Kyushu.

Passenger statistics
In fiscal 2014, there were a total of 49,349 boarding passengers, giving a daily average of 135 passengers.

Environs
National Route 34
National Hospital Organization Nagasaki Medical Center

See also
 List of railway stations in Japan

References

External links 

Iwamatsu Station (JR Kyushu)

Railway stations in Nagasaki Prefecture
Railway stations in Japan opened in 1945
Ōmura Line